Achryson uniforme is a species of longhorn beetle in the Cerambycinae subfamily. It was described by Martins and Monné in 1975. It is known from Bolivia.

References

Achrysonini
Beetles described in 1975